Bartkūniškiai is a village in Kėdainiai district municipality, in Kaunas County, central Lithuania. It is located 3 km from Kėdainiai, by the Smilga and Klamputis rivers. According to the 2011 census, the village has a population of 71 people.

There are former folwark building and park.

Demography

References

Villages in Kaunas County
Kėdainiai District Municipality